Royersford is a borough in Montgomery County, Pennsylvania, United States,  northwest of Philadelphia, on the Schuylkill River.

History

The town drew its name from the location of a ford across the Schuylkill River, which happened to be adjacent to land owned by the Royer family.  Early in the twentieth century, it had several stove factories, two glass and bottle works, hosiery and silk mills, a dye and bleaching plant, manufactories of bricks, gas meters, stockings, shirts, shafting parts, wagons, agricultural implements, etc. The population stood at 2,607 people in 1900, and at 3,073 in 1910. The population was 4,940 at the 2020 census. The borough was formed from the southeastern corner of Limerick Township in 1879.  Royersford served by the Spring-Ford Area School District.

The Continental Stove Works was added to the National Register of Historic Places in 1986.

Geography
Royersford is located at  (40.185239, -75.537648). The borough lies on the northern banks of the Schuylkill River, and is considered a suburb of Philadelphia.

Transportation

No numbered highways traverse the borough directly. Main streets through the town include Main Street, Lewis Road and Second Avenue. The nearest major highway is U.S. Route 422.

SEPTA provides Suburban Bus service to Royersford along Route 139, which runs between the King of Prussia Transit Center at the King of Prussia mall and Limerick.

Demographics

As of the 2010 census, the borough was 89.7% White, 5.1% Black or African American, 0.2% Native American, 1.7% Asian, and 2.4% were two or more races. 4.2% of the population were of Hispanic or Latino ancestry .

As of the census of 2000, there were 4,246 people, 1,928 households, and 1,066 families residing in the borough. The population density was 5,400.8 people per square mile (2,075.2/km2). There were 2,039 housing units at an average density of 2,593.5 per square mile (996.5/km2). The racial makeup of the borough was 95.97% White, 1.95% African American, 0.24% Native American, 0.64% Asian, 0.28% from other races, and 0.92% from two or more races. Hispanic or Latino of any race were 1.18% of the population.

There were 1,928 households, out of which 26.1% had children under the age of 18 living with them, 41.1% were married couples living together, 10.9% had a female householder with no husband present, and 44.7% were non-families. 38.8% of all households were made up of individuals, and 14.4% had someone living alone who was 65 years of age or older. The average household size was 2.20 and the average family size was 2.96.

In the borough the population was spread out, with 22.8% under the age of 18, 8.3% from 18 to 24, 32.5% from 25 to 44, 21.3% from 45 to 64, and 15.1% who were 65 years of age or older. The median age was 38 years. For every 100 females, there were 93.2 males. For every 100 females age 18 and over, there were 87.4 males.

The median income for a household in the borough was $39,442, and the median income for a family was $55,579. Males had a median income of $36,189 versus $28,689 for females. The per capita income for the borough was $21,314. None of the families and 2.7% of the population were living below the poverty line, including no under eighteens and 6.1% of those over 64.

Politics and government

Royersford has a city manager form of government with a mayor and a seven-member borough council.  The mayor is Jenna Antoniewicz. Royersford was founded by David Royer.

The borough is part of the Fourth Congressional District (represented by Rep. Madeleine Dean), the 146th State House District (represented by Rep. Joe Ciresi) and the 44th State Senate District (represented by Sen. Katie Muth).

Education
Spring-Ford Area School District operates public schools.

The area Catholic school is Holy Cross Regional Catholic School in Collegeville. Holy Cross was formed in 2012 by the merger of Sacred Heart in Royersford and St. Eleanor in Collegeville.

Entertainment

Parts of the classic 1958 horror film The Blob, starring Steve McQueen, were filmed in Royersford.

The film The Lovely Bones, starring Mark Wahlberg, directed by Peter Jackson, was filmed in the borough in late November 2007.

The Bloodhound Gang's most famous album, Hooray for Boobies, was recorded at Dome Studios on Main Street.

A scene in M. Night Shyamalan's 2015 film The Visit was filmed at the intersection of Washington Street and South 7th Avenue. A local middle school, the Spring-Ford Eighth Grade Center, was used as the backdrop.

Notable person
Bob Shoudt, aka Notorious B.O.B., competitive eater and YouTuber

References

External links

 Borough of Royersford

Populated places on the Schuylkill River
Populated places established in 1718
Boroughs in Montgomery County, Pennsylvania
1718 establishments in Pennsylvania